Almir Cunha dos Santos (born 4 September 1993) is a Brazilian male track and field athlete who competes in the triple jump and long jump. He was a silver medallist in the triple jump at the IAAF World Indoor Championships in 2018.

Athletic career
Born in Matupá, in the central state of Mato Grosso, he took up athletics at a young age, initially focusing on the high jump. He moved to Porto Alegre and had his first success at the 2010 South American Youth Championships in Athletics, where he took the gold medal.

After little progress in the high jump in the 2014 and 2015 seasons, he returned to the long jump in 2017.

He backed this up with a performance at the top level Madrid Indoor Meeting in February, winning with a world-leading mark of  ahead of former world and Olympic champion Nelson Évora.

After 2018, Almir dos Santos had a series of injuries, and only in 2022 he returned to compete at a high level, reaching the final of the triple jump at the 2022 World Athletics Championships, finishing in 7th place.

International competitions

Personal bests
High jump –  (2014)
Long jump –  (2017)
Triple jump –  (2018)
Triple jump indoor –  (2019)

References

External links

Living people
1993 births
Brazilian male triple jumpers
Brazilian male long jumpers
Brazilian male high jumpers
Sportspeople from Mato Grosso
Athletes (track and field) at the 2019 Pan American Games
Pan American Games athletes for Brazil
Athletes (track and field) at the 2020 Summer Olympics
Olympic athletes of Brazil